The 1944 Utah Redskins football team was an American football team that represented the University of Utah as a member of the Mountain States Conference (MSC) during the 1944 college football season. In their 20th season under head coach Ike Armstrong, the Redskins compiled an overall record of 5–2–1 with a mark of 1–2–1 against conference opponents, placing third in the MSC.

Schedule

After the season

NFL Draft
Utah had one player selected in the 1945 NFL Draft.

References

Utah
Utah Utes football seasons
Utah Redskins football